Lake Dora (Wanman: Ngayartakujarra) is a seasonal salt lake located in the Pilbara region of Western Australia. It lies between the vegetated sand fields of the Great Sandy and Gibson Deserts. The Rudall River occasionally flows into Lake Dora.

See also

 List of lakes of Western Australia
 Karlamilyi National Park - Lake Dora lies entirely within the park.

References

Dora
Dora
Great Sandy Desert